

Bydgoszcz
Hotel "Bohema" in Bydgoszcz
Hotel Brda in Bydgoszcz
Hotel "Pod Orlem" in Bydgoszcz

Katowice
Altus Skyscraper
Monopol Hotel

Kraków
Sheraton Grand Kraków

Lublin
Grand Hotel Lublinianka

Łódź
Andel's Hotel Łódź

Sopot
Grand Hotel

Warsaw
Hotel Bristol, Warsaw
Centrum LIM
Hotel Europejski
InterContinental Warsaw
Novotel Warszawa Centrum
Hotel Polonia Palace
Hotel Polski
Branicki Residential House

Wroclaw
Monopol Hotel
Sky Tower

Other
Czocha Castle
Gola Dzierżoniowska Castle
Książ
Tuczno Castle

Hotels in Poland
Poland
Hotels
Hotels